Helfa Gelf (English: Arts Trail) is the Welsh-language name for the largest open studio event in north Wales, with more than 300 artists. The annual art event has been held every September since 2006, now extending over five counties of North Wales. The Art Trail combines over 100 artists Open Studios and Artists Open Houses with events located all kinds of venues: studios, galleries, village halls and even garden sheds.

Although it is an independent body, it seeks much external sponsorship, and is organised in co-operation with many bodies including county councils, the Arts Council of Wales, Betsi Cadwaladr University Health Board, Anglesey Arts Forum, Royal Cambrian Academy, Oriel Plas Glyn Y Weddw, Bodelwyddan Castle, Gwynedd Economic Partnership, Menter Môn and Cadwyn Clwyd.

References

External links
 Art Trail/Helfa Gelf Official Website
 Clwyd Theatr Cymru
 BBC Photo Gallery on the event in 201
 Flintshire Chronicle on the Call for Artists 2013

Arts festivals in Wales
Autumn events in Wales